The Keibul Lamjao National Park is a national park in the Bishnupur district of the state of Manipur in Northeast India. It is currently under the tentative lists of the UNESCO World Heritage Sites, under the title "Keibul Lamjao Conservation Area (KLCA)", additionally covering the buffer of Loktak Lake (140 sq km) and Pumlen Pat (43 sq. km).

The national park is characterized by floating decomposed plant material locally called phumdi. It was created in 1966 as a wildlife sanctuary to preserve the natural habitat of the endangered Eld's deer (Cervus eldi eldi). In 1977, it was gazetted as national park.

History
The brow-antlered deer, which was first discovered in Manipur in 1839 and named Cervus eldi eldi in 1844 in honour of Lt. Percy Eld – a British officer, was reported an extinct species in 1951. It has a pride of place in the folklore and culture of the Manipur state and is the state animal of Manipur. From a small herd of 14 deer in 1975, its population was reportedly 155 in 1995 and as per the latest wildlife census conducted in March 2016 its number rose to 260.

Geography and topography
The park is a swamp  with floating mass of vegetation created by accrual of organic garbage and biomass with soil particles that has been thickened into a solid form called phumdis, at the south–eastern side of the Loktak Lake, which has been declared a Ramsar site. Two thirds to three fourths of the total park area is formed by phumdis. A waterway through the park provides year-round access by boats plying through the Loktak Lake, to the Pabot Hill in the north. The swamp encompasses three hills, namely, Pabot, Toya and Chingjao that provide a refuge for the large mammals during the monsoon season. The distinctive nature of the park is that it is "too deep to be marsh, too shallow to be a lake".

Ownership rights
While the area on the periphery of the park is privately owned, the park itself is predominantly state-owned.

Hydrologic features

The size of the park varies with the seasons as it is formed of phumdis (morass of organic matter). The peripheral areas of the lake are grounded to the bed of the lake during the dry season but get almost substantially submerged for a few days during the monsoon season. About twenty percent of its thickness floats on the lake, above the surface, which supports the weight of large mammals.

Weather
Humidity was a recorded high of 81% in August with a minimum of 49% in March.

Flora and fauna

The park, primarily composed of moist semi–evergreen forests, has a rich amalgam of aquatic, wetland and terrestrial ecosystem. The grass land structure of the park is divided into three zones.

Aquatic flora
Aquatic flora recorded in the park include  Zizania latifolia (wild rice, ishing kambong), Tripidium bengalense, Eiranthus procerus (singnang), Dioscorea bulbifera (phumha), Cynodon dactylon (tinthou), Alpinia galanga (pullei), Eichhornia crassipes (kabokang), Hedychium coronarium (loklei), Nelumbo nucifera (thambal) and Phragmites karka (tou).

Some of the above-listed flora had been recorded in two types of phumdis namely, the phumdi ataoba (floating) and the phumdi aruppa (sinking); reeds, grasses, and other plants growing on a mat of dead and decaying vegetation floating on the lake surface form the ataoba, while Phumdi aruppa has mats of vegetation which have sunk to the bottom of the lake and support a rich emergent growth of reeds and grasses. In a 1960 estimate, the phumdi vegetation had been structured into 45% Phragmites karka, 25% Erianthus ravennae (elephant grass), 15% Saccharum munja, 5% S. latifolium, 5% Alpinia allughas and 2% Saccharum procerum and 3% other species, including Zizania latifolia; Zizania latifolia is the plant much relished by the sangai deer. Eichhornia crassipes was a recent species in the open water areas of the swamp in the midst of Polygonum (buckwheat) and Trapa (water caltrop or water chestnut). The three hills surrounding the park are now denuded of most of the vegetation.

Fauna

Apart from the brow-antlered deer (Cervus eldi eldi), the flagship species of the park, other fauna found in the park were the following:
Mammals reported are the  hog deer (C. porcinus), wild boar (Sus scrofa), large Indian civet (Viverra civetta), common otter (Lutra lutra), fox, jungle cat (Felis chaus), Asian golden cat, bay bamboo rat, musk shrew, common shrew, flying fox and sambar (Cervus unicolor).
Fishes include Channa striata, Channa punctatus, common carp, Wallago attu and pool barb. 
Amphibians and reptiles include the keel back tortoise, viper, krait, cobra, water cobra, banded krait, Asian rat snake (beauty rat snake), python, Russel's viper (Daboia), checkered garter snake and common lizard (Viviparous lizard). Python molurus is also found in the park.

Avifauna
Prominent bird species recorded in the park are both migratory and resident. Some of them are the East Himalayan pied kingfisher, black kite, lesser sky-lark, northern hill myna, Indian pied myna, North Indian black drongos, lesser eastern jungle crow, yellow headed wagtail, spotbill duck, blue-winged teal, ruddy shell duck, threatened hooded crane, Burmese sarus sarus crane, Indian white-breasted waterhen and crimson-breasted pied woodpecker.

Threats
Some of the identified threats to the park are elaborated below.

 The threats to the park are due to the permanent flooding of the park and its resultant effect on the thickness of phumdis. This has disturbed the natural cycle of floating and sinking of phumdis which used to be maintained in the park. Maintenance of high water level in the lake throughout the year for Loktak Multipurpose Project has broken this annual cycle and phumdis remain floating throughout the year during dry season and are no more available to phumdi vegetation. Therefore, the growth of vegetation on phumdis and their thickness are believed to be gradually decreasing.
 Before the construction of the Loktak Hydro Electric Project, the phumdis floated during flooding by backflow from the Khordak River and discharge from other streams and nalas and settled down on lake bed during dry season when water was drawn out through the same river. This resulted in enhancing of nutrients and minerals of the phumdi vegetation from the bottom of the lake during the dry period. But this cycle has been disturbed by the Loktak Hydro Electric project. One apprehension is that at some stage the phumdis may not be able to support the number of the Eld's deer or sangai deer.
 The national park and the Loktak Lake have provided sustenance (through fishing, growing, and collection of vegetables of economic importance) to the people living in the peripheral villages and on the phumdis. The effect of maintaining permanently high water level is stated to be a serious threat to the phumdis and consequently to the people living on the lake/park's natural resources.
 Earlier, there was only marshy land in the park area but after commissioning of the hydroelectric project two ecosystems have emerged; one with water body covering one-third area and the other the phumdis, which covers two-thirds area.
 Deteriorating water quality is indicated by the recorded pH values of 4 to 8.5. The reasons for poor quality are attributed to flow of 
pollutants from the towns draining into the lake, 
use of agrochemicals for farming in the surrounding farmland, 
accumulation of water on phumdi, 
deforestation and subsequent soil erosion in the catchment area and 
rotting vegetation.

Conservation measures
Conservation measures suggested relate to development and implementation of a management plan giving priority to long term conservation, monitoring the condition of habitat and to take timely corrective measures by enforcing strict protection of core areas, particularly with reference to the water level due to the Loktak Hydro Electric Power Project. 

Some of the measures suggested and under implementation are elaborated as 

 provide effective protection, 
 developing and maintaining high places with adequate protection and food material to provide protection to the animals in case of flash flood, 
 increasing area under phumdis in the park, 
 preventing theft of phumdis and flow or part of phumdis towards northern side, 
 topping completely the collection of firewood, food and fodder, 
 creating an environment in which local people volunteer as natural custodian of sangai and other animals in the park, 
 to encourage ecotourism and nature education, 
 to undertake, aid, promote and co–ordinate research works, 
 capacity building, training, awareness and extension activities, 
 launching packaging and publicity campaign and 
 propagating ethnic information, exhibition and so forth.
Conservation measures implemented
The measures that have been implemented by the Forest Department of the Manipur Government are the following.

 A perimeter fence of  length in most vulnerable sections of the park to prevent people and domestic livestock from entering the reserve has been created
 A cattle-proof trench has been dug along  of the boundary
 Seven canoes and four checkpoints are established at strategic places for security.
 Army helicopter has carried out census work.
 The park is under the supervision of full–time forest officials.
 Capacity building has been achieved by exclusive placement of an Assistant Conservator of  Forests, an assistant veterinary surgeon, a ranger of forests, field assistant, three foresters, four forest guards and eight others for the park.

Visitor information

The park is approachable by road, rail and air through Imphal, the capital of Manipur. Public and private transport ply on these roads.

Resorts under the Classic Hotel for family and travel-loving couple are available in the Sendra island park which is 5-6 kilometers away from the National Park. Staying at Imphal which has better hotel facilities is a preferred option.

Visit to the park is ideal between 0600 and 1000 hrs in the morning and 1530 and 1800 hrs in the afternoon, when the sangai deer comes out to feed in herds. A boat trip along the labyrinthine boat routes passing through colourful water plants would be a good way to see the park. An adventurous trip would be to take a walk through the park but the phumdi is not a firm ground. Manipur Tourism Department arranges conducted day tours to the Loktak Lake and the Keibul Lamjao Park.

Manipur is considered a sensitive border state. Earlier the Foreigners entering Manipur (including foreign citizens born in Manipur) was needed to possess a Restricted Area Permit, but now it has been lifted from the state. There is no permit required for foreigners coming to Manipur, they only need to register themselves in the established check points i.e. Imphal Airport and (Mao and Jiribam) for those coming by road.

Films 
 The Return of Sangai is a documentary about Keibul Lamjao National Park and Sangai made by forest department Manipur. The film is available in both English and Manipuri.

References

See also 

National parks in Manipur
Protected areas established in 1977
Bishnupur district
Floating islands
1977 establishments in Manipur
Islands of India
Uninhabited islands of India